Jason Casco (born February 13, 1990) is a Nicaraguan football player who currently plays for Real Estelí F.C.

External links

1990 births
Living people
Nicaraguan men's footballers
Nicaragua international footballers
Sportspeople from Managua
Real Estelí F.C. players
C.D. Walter Ferretti players
Association football defenders